Vețca ( or colloquially Vécke, Hungarian pronunciation:) is a commune in Mureș County, Transylvania, Romania that is composed of three villages:
Jacodu / Magyarzsákod
Sălașuri / Székelyszállás
Vețca

History
Vețca is part of the Székely Land region of the historical Transylvania province. Until 1918, the village belonged to the Maros-Torda County of the Kingdom of Hungary. After the Hungarian–Romanian War of 1918–19 and the Treaty of Trianon of 1920, it became part of Romania.

Demographics
The commune has an absolute Hungarian majority. According to the 2011 census, it had a population of 892; out of those, 84.9% were Hungarian, 11.0% were Roma, and 1.3% were Romanian.

See also
List of Hungarian exonyms (Mureș County)

References

Communes in Mureș County
Localities in Transylvania